D'Arcy Britton Plunkett (1872 – 3 May 1936) was a Conservative member of the House of Commons of Canada. He was born in Orillia, Ontario and became an ironworker.

Plunkett served in the military as an air mechanic for the Royal Flying Corps.

He was first elected to Parliament at the Victoria, British Columbia riding in a by-election on 6 December 1928 then re-elected in 1930 and 1935. Plunkett died on 3 May 1936 from pneumonia before completing his term in the 18th Canadian Parliament. He remained single until death, leaving three brothers and three nephews. Plunkett was buried in Orillia.

References

External links
 

1872 births
1936 deaths
Deaths from pneumonia in Ontario
Conservative Party of Canada (1867–1942) MPs
Members of the House of Commons of Canada from British Columbia
People from Orillia